Cargo ships of the class Type RO 15 are RoRo vessels built by Wismar's Mathias Thesen Yard.

History 
The class was built in 1982/83 and consists of 3 units.

 The first ship of the class was the Gleichberg handed over to the Deutsche Seereederei in July 1982 with works number 150.
 In June 1983 its sister ship, the Auersberg followed. It was re-christened Pasewalk in 1999 and  Caribbean Carrier in 2005. The Caribbean Carrier arriving in Alang on 6 January 2011.
 The last of the trio was the Kahleberg, delivered in October 1983 with works number 152. The ship was converted in 1992 to a RoPax ferry. Since 2005 it has been named the RG 1.

Ships of the class 
 1982 Gleichberg
 1983 Auersberg
 1983 Kahleberg

Literature

See also 
 Class leader
 List of boat types

Footnotes 

Cargo ships
Ship types